Waterloo is a 1929 German silent war film directed by Karl Grune and starring Charles Willy Kayser, Charles Vanel and Otto Gebühr. It depicts the victory of the Allied Forces over Napoleon at the Battle of Waterloo in 1815.

It was made at the Emelka Studios of Bavaria Film in Munich. The film's sets were designed by the art director Ludwig Reiber. The film was inspired by Abel Gance's epic Napoléon and made use of similar filming techniques.

Cast

References

Bibliography
 Bock, Hans-Michael & Bergfelder, Tim. The Concise Cinegraph: Encyclopaedia of German Cinema. Berghahn Books, 2009.

External links

1929 films
1920s historical films
1929 war films
Cultural depictions of Arthur Wellesley, 1st Duke of Wellington
Cultural depictions of Gebhard Leberecht von Blücher
Cultural depictions of Charles Maurice de Talleyrand-Périgord
Cultural depictions of Klemens von Metternich
Films about Napoleon
German historical films
German war films
Films of the Weimar Republic
German silent feature films
Films directed by Karl Grune
Napoleonic Wars films
Films set in 1815
Films set in Waterloo, Belgium
Bavaria Film films
Films shot at Bavaria Studios
Works about the Battle of Waterloo
German black-and-white films
1920s German films